Myer Stefan Major Bevan (born 23 April 1997) is a New Zealand professional footballer who plays as a forward for Canadian club Cavalry FC and the New Zealand national football team.

Club career

Early career
Bevan played in his native New Zealand with Western Springs before moving to Auckland City, where he made his first-team debut on 28 February 2016, as an 86-minute substitute against WaiBOP United. In the summer of 2016, Bevan moved to the Nike Academy in England.

Vancouver Whitecaps
On 15 May 2017, Bevan signed with Canadian United Soccer League side Whitecaps FC 2. After one season with Vancouver's reserve side, he transferred to Vancouver Whitecaps' MLS team on 13 December 2017.

In 2018, Bevan moved to Sweden's third-tier on loan at Husqvarna FF. After making five starts, he returned to his parent club. Later that season, he went on loan in the USL with the Whitecaps' affiliate club, Fresno FC.

Bevan was released by Vancouver at the end of their 2018 season. He trained with A-League side Wellington Phoenix and later trialled with Polish side Puszcza Niepołomice in early 2019, but could not win a contract with either team.

Second spell at Auckland City
In 2019, Bevan returned to Auckland City, where he went on to score fifteen goals in sixteen games that season, winning the league Golden Boot.

TS Galaxy
Bevan joined South African Premier Soccer League side TS Galaxy in 2020.

Third spell at Auckland City
Bevan joined Auckland City in 2021 after being released by TS Galaxy.

Cavalry FC
On 28 January 2022, Bevan returned to Canada, signing with Canadian Premier League side Cavalry FC. He scored his first goal for Cavalry in the preliminary round of the 2022 Canadian Championship against FC Edmonton, first opening the scoring and then adding a penalty goal in a 2-1 victory. This result seemed to give his play a boost after a slower start to the season, and Bevan scored in both of his next two matches. In January 2023, Bevan signed a new two-year contract with Cavalry, with an option for 2025.

International career 
Bevan made his senior international debut for New Zealand in a 6–1 victory over Solomon Islands in a FIFA World Cup qualifier on 1 September 2017.

Bevan represented New Zealand at the 2019 OFC Men's Olympic Qualifying Tournament, scoring in all five matches for a total of twelve goals in five appearances.

Personal life
Bevan also holds Canadian citizenship.

Career statistics

Club

International

Scores and results list New Zealand's goal tally first.

Honours
Auckland City
 New Zealand Football Championship: 2019–20

Individual
 New Zealand Football Championship Golden Boot: 2019–20
 OFC Men's Olympic Qualifying Tournament top scorer: 2019

References

External links

1997 births
Living people
Association football forwards
New Zealand association footballers
Canadian soccer players
Association footballers from Auckland
People educated at St Peter's College, Auckland
New Zealand expatriate association footballers
Expatriate footballers in England
New Zealand expatriate sportspeople in England
Expatriate footballers in Sweden
New Zealand expatriate sportspeople in Sweden
Expatriate soccer players in the United States
New Zealand expatriate sportspeople in the United States
Expatriate soccer players in South Africa
New Zealand expatriate sportspeople in South Africa
Auckland City FC players
Nike Academy players
Whitecaps FC 2 players
Husqvarna FF players
Fresno FC players
TS Galaxy F.C. players
Cavalry FC players
New Zealand Football Championship players
USL Championship players
Ettan Fotboll players
South African Premier Division players
Canadian Premier League players
New Zealand National League players
New Zealand under-20 international footballers
New Zealand under-23 international footballers
New Zealand international footballers